The 2012 Women's Junior South American Volleyball Championship was the 21st edition of the tournament, organised by South America's governing volleyball body, the Confederación Sudamericana de Voleibol (CSV). It was determined February 26, 2011 the Peru would be the host. The top three teams qualified for the 2013 Junior World Championship.

Competing nations
The following national teams participated in the tournament, teams were seeded according to how they finished in the previous edition of the tournament:

First round
Venue: Coliseo Eduardo Dibos, Lima, Peru
All times are Peruvian Standard Time (UTC−05:00)

Pool A

Pool B

Final round

5th to 8th places bracket

Championship bracket

Classification 5 to 8

Semifinals

7th place match

5th place match

Bronze Medal match

Gold Medal match

Final standing

Individual awards

Best Scorer

Best Spiker

Best Blocker

Best Server

Best Digger

Best Setter

Best Receiver

Best Libero

References

External links
CSV official website

Women's South American Volleyball Championships
S
Volleyball
International volleyball competitions hosted by Peru
Youth volleyball